Tommaso di Sicilia, O.P. (died 1526) was a Roman Catholic prelate who served as Bishop of Minori (1510–1526).

Biography
Tommaso di Sicilia was ordained a priest in the Order of Preachers.
On 30 Sep 1510, he was appointed during the papacy of Pope Julius II as Bishop of Minori.
He served as Bishop of Minori until his death on 1 Jan 1526.

References

External links and additional sources
 (for Chronology of Bishops) 
 (for Chronology of Bishops) 

16th-century Italian Roman Catholic bishops
Bishops appointed by Pope Julius II
1526 deaths
Dominican bishops